Helmut Müller (born 31 May 1952 in Heidelberg) is a German politician of the Christian Democratic Union (CDU). He has been the mayor of Wiesbaden from 2007 to 2013.

Life 
Müller was born in Heidelberg, Baden-Württemberg. After finishing his abitur in 1972, he studied economics at Ludwig Maximilian University of Munich. He earned his Diplom in 1978.

See also
Politics of Germany

External links

 Personal website at wiesbaden.de

1952 births
Christian Democratic Union of Germany politicians
Living people
Mayors of Wiesbaden
Politicians from Heidelberg